Microtis media subsp. densiflora, commonly known as the dense mignonette orchid, is a species of orchid which is endemic to the south–west of Western Australia. It has a single smooth, tubular leaf and a flowering spike with up to one hundred and fifty small yellowish-green flowers. It differs from Microtis media subsp. media in the shape of its flower spike and the shape of its labellum.

Description 
Flowering occurs from October to January.

Taxonomy and naming
The dense mignonette orchid was first formally described in 1873 by George Bentham who gave it the name Microtis parviflora var. densiflora and published the description in Flora Australiensis. In 1990 Robert Bates included it as a subspecies of Microtis media along with subspecies media and quadrata. The last of these has since been raised to species status as M. quadrata by David Jones and Mark Clements.

The epithet (densiflora) is derived from the Latin densus (thick, crowded, dense), and -florus (-flowered) referring to the dense flower spike.

Distribution and habitat
The dense mignonette orchid is found between Perth and Albany where it grows seasonally in wet placed.

Conservation
Microtis media subsp. densiflora is classified as "not threatened" by the Western Australian Government Department of Parks and Wildlife.

References

External links
 

media subsp. densiflora
Endemic orchids of Australia
Orchids of Western Australia
Plants described in 1873